Antonín Presl (born 6 August 1988) is a Czech football player who currently plays for Táborsko in the Czech 2. Liga.

External links

Czech footballers
1988 births
Living people
Czech First League players
FC Viktoria Plzeň players
MFK Karviná players
FC Silon Táborsko players
Association football forwards